The following is a comprehensive discography of Cinderella, an American hard rock/glam metal band.

Albums

Studio albums

Live albums

Compilation albums

Singles

Videos
Night Songs: The Videos (1987) - VHS Gold (RIAA)
Tales from the Gypsy Road (1990) - VHS (Later reissued as 2009 DVD) Gold (RIAA)
Looking Back Video Collection (1997) - VHS
Cinderella Millennium DVD Video Collection (2003) - DVD
Rocked, Wired & Bluesed – The Greatest Video Hits (2005) - DVD
Cinderella: In Concert - The Heartbreak Station Tour (2005) - DVD
Cinderella: In Concert (2008) - DVD (Same content as Cinderella: In Concert - The Heartbreak Station Tour 2005 DVD)
Tales from the Gypsy Road 2008 (2009) - DVD (2009 DVD reissue of 1990 VHS)
In Concert: Remastered Edition (2009) - DVD (includes Bonus CD)
In Concert: Live 1991 (2010) - DVD

References

Cinderella (band)
Discographies of American artists
Heavy metal group discographies
Rock music group discographies